Jiashan may refer to the following locations in China:

 Jiashan County (嘉善县), Zhejiang
 Jiashan Township, Anhui (佳山乡), in Yushan District, Ma'anshan
 Jiashan Township, Hunan (槚山乡), in You County
 Jiashan Township, Jilin (甲山乡), in Dongliao County